Dr. Sivaji Bandyopadhyay is an Indian academic and is currently the Chairperson and Director of National Institute of Technology Silchar. He is a Professor of Computer Science and Engineering. He obtained his B.Tech, M.Tech and Ph.D. in Computer Science and Engineering from Jadavpur University and taught there as a Professor before joining NIT Silchar.  Formerly, he has been the Dean of Engineering and Technology at Jadavpur University, the Head of the Department of Computer Science and Engineering at Jadavpur University, the Director of the Computer-Aided Design Centre at Jadavpur University and the Coordinator, TEQIP-II at Jadavpur University among other responsibilities.

He is one of the top 50 computer scientists in India and the top 6000 computer scientists around the world with an Indian rank of 40 and a global rank of 5883

During his tenure as the Chairperson and Director of National Institute of Technology Silchar, NIT Silchar has been ranked globally for the 1st time with 201-250 overall Asian rank (19th among Indian universities) by Times Higher Education, Asian University Rankings 2021, 251-300 overall Emerging Universities rank by Times Higher Education, Emerging Economies University Rankings 2021, 275th overall global rank by UI GreenMetric World University Rankings 2020, 601-800 global rank in Engineering by Times Higher Education, Engineering Rankings 2021, 601-800 global rank in Physical Sciences by Times Higher Education, Physical Sciences Rankings 2021, 750th global rank by US News Engineering Rankings 2020 and 801-1000 overall global rank (19th among Indian universities) by Times Higher Education, World University Rankings 2021.
 
Professor Bandyopadhyay has supervised over 12 Ph.D. students and a total of 12 Ph.D. scholars are currently working under his supervision. He has published around 49 research articles in reputed journals and 250 research publications in reputed conferences, workshops or symposiums. He has also authored two books. He has completed 4 international research and development projects - with Germany, France, Mexico, Japan as the Principal Investigator in the area of Sentiment Analysis, Question Answering, and Textual Entailment. He was the Chief Investigator of 8 National level consortium mode projects in the areas of Machine Translation - English to Indian languages and Indian language to Indian languages, cross-lingual information access, development of treebank for Indian languages among others. Currently, he is executing three international projects funded by SPARC (MHRD) with Germany, ASEAN (DST) with Indonesia and Malaysia, DST and CNRS with France. The Center for Natural Language Processing (CNLP), a research centre has been established at NIT Silchar under his leadership.

Publications 
 Affective Computing and Sentiment Analysis
 Selective absorption of H2S from gas streams containing H2S and CO2 into aqueous solutions of N-methyldiethanolamine and 2-amino-2-methyl-1-propanol

References

External links 
 Personal WebPage
 Google Scholar
 WebPage at NIT Silchar

Living people
Jadavpur University alumni
Academic staff of Jadavpur University
Indian computer scientists
Engineers from West Bengal
West Bengal academics
Year of birth missing (living people)